Rajesh Yadav is an Indian politician and a member of the Sixteenth Legislative Assembly of Uttar Pradesh in India. He represents the Katra constituency of Uttar Pradesh and is a member of the Samajwadi Party political party.

Early life and education
Rajesh Yadav was born in Shahjahanpur district. He attended the Guru Nanak Dev Engineering College and Swami Sukhdevanand Law College and attained Bachelor of Engineering & Bachelor of Laws degrees.

Political career
Rajesh Yadav has been a MLA for two terms. He represented the Katra constituency and is a member of the Samajwadi Party political party.

He lost his seat in the 2017 Uttar Pradesh Assembly election to Veer Vikram Singh Prince of the Bharatiya Janata Party.

Posts held

See also
 Katra (Assembly constituency)
 Sixteenth Legislative Assembly of Uttar Pradesh
 Tilhar (Assembly constituency)
 Uttar Pradesh Legislative Assembly

References 

Samajwadi Party politicians
Uttar Pradesh MLAs 2007–2012
Uttar Pradesh MLAs 2012–2017
People from Shahjahanpur district
1969 births
Living people